Miral is a 2022 Indian Tamil-language slasher film written and directed by M. Sakthivel, in his directorial debut, and produced by G. Dilli Babu under the banner of Axess Film Factory. The film stars Bharath and Vani Bhojan in lead roles, with K. S. Ravikumar appearing in a supporting role. The film was  theatrically released on 11 November 2022.

Cast
 Bharath as Hari
 Vani Bhojan as Rama, Hari's wife
 K. S. Ravikumar as Rama's father
 Meera Krishnan as Rama's mother
 Rajkumar as Anand, Hari's friend
 Kaavya Arivumani as Hema, Anand's wife
 Arjai as Police inspector
 Naren Balaji
 Master Ankit as Sai, Hari's son

Reception 
A critic from Times of India wrote that the film "tries to threaten but fails due to mediocre writing", and that "overall, Miral scares us in parts but doesn't threaten or keeps on the edge of our seats". The film received further mixed reviews from Vikatan and Dinamalar.

References

External links

2022 films
2020s Tamil-language films
Indian slasher films
Indian thriller films
2022 directorial debut films
2020s slasher films